Class 8 may refer to:

 8 Metre (keelboat), class of racing yacht
 British Rail Class 08, British diesel shunting engine
 BR Standard Class 8, British 4-6-2 steam locomotive
 First Class 8, French racing yacht
 GCR Class 8, British 4-6-0 steam locomotive
 HAZMAT Class 8 Corrosive Substances
 L&YR Class 8, British 4-6-0 steam locomotive
 NSB Class 8, Norwegian standard-gauge steam locomotive
 NSB Class VIII, Norwegian narrow-gauge steam locomotive
 NSB El 8, Norwegian electric locomotive
 NSB Di 8, Norwegian diesel locomotive
 SCORE Class 8, off-road racing trucks
 TT Class 8, tram of Trondheim, Norway
 Class 8 truck, US truck class for heavy trucks over 33,000 pounds weight limit